Saal is a municipality  in the district of Kelheim in Bavaria in Germany. It is located along the banks of the Danube River, around 25 km southwest of Regensburg.

Ortsteile
Villages affiliated to the administration (Ortsteil) of Saal are 
 Buchhofen
 Reißing
 Mitterfecking
 Peterfecking
 Oberfecking
 Einmuß
 Seilbach
 Oberschambach
 Unterschambach
 Oberteuerting
 Unterteuerting
 Kleinberghofen
 Gstreifet
 Kleingiersdorf

History

The first settlements in Regensburg date back to the ages of the Hallstatt culture.

Saal was first mentioned in a document in 1002. Apparently Saal was at that time owned by Henry II, then 
Duke of Bavaria, and given to the Niedermünster Abbey in Regensburg.

Already around 1530, the Thurn und Taxis family started to run a post-house in Saal. The German poet Johann Wolfgang von Goethe stopped during his journey to Italy on September 5, 1786, at 15h in Saal for swapping horses at the post-house. The post horn featuring the coat of arms of Saal today still reminds of this tradition.

During World War II, a subcamp of the Nazi concentration camp Flossenbürg, named Ringberg Me, 
was installed nearby the street connecting Saal and the neighboring village Teugn. The goal was to construct an underground arms industry plant
for Messerschmitt, a German aircraft manufacturer. At peak times more than 600 men were imprisoned in the subcamp. After the war 20 bodies and the ashes of about 360 people were found.

References

Historical Development of Saal an der Donau (in German)
Neustadt a. d. Donau > History > Goethe in Neustadt a.d. Donau (in German)
Subcamps of Konzentrationslager Flossenbürg, Location: Saal a.d. Donau (in German) search at Deutschland - Ein Denkmal (english information page)

Kelheim (district)
Populated places on the Danube